Big Brother 2008 was the fourth season of the Finnish version of the reality television show Big Brother. It aired on Sub (former Subtv) in Finland, from 26 August 2008 to 30 November 2008, lasting for 97 days.

Vappu Pimiä was the host of Big Brother Talk Show and Janne Kataja hosted of Big Brother Extra.

Unlike previous seasons, this year the Sub also aired an interactive text message contest Big Brother Game on weekdays, hosted by three of housemates from the third season Kadi, Farbod and Aki. This year's fallen residents hosted individual broadcasts. 

This season has pre-determined rules that all housemates must strictly follow. Housemate violated the rules will be punished. However, Big Brother reserves the right to change the rules at any time without notice.

The open auditions for the season were completed in April 2008 in Helsinki, Oulu, Rovaniemi, Jyväskylä, Tampere and Turku. In addition, based on audition videos published on the Internet community, the public could choose their own favorite as a housemates.

A number of contestants (known as "housemates") live in a purpose-built house in Espoo, and are isolated from the rest of the world. Each week, each housemate nominates two of their peers for eviction, and the housemates who receive the most nominations will face a public vote. Of these, one will eventually leave, having been "evicted" from the House. However, there sometimes are exceptions to this process as dictated by Big Brother, known as "twists".

Housemates
Thirteen housemates entered the house on the launch night. Four entered on Day 20, shortly before Marko's eviction, while two housemates entered on Day 45 as replacements for Harri and Marianna. Another two male housemates entered on Day 71, and one housemate on Day 73.

Voting format 
Any viewer may cast as many evict or save votes as they choose. Prior to eviction each housemates' evict votes were merged with their save votes; the housemate with the lowest number of save votes remaining after the merge is evicted.

Nominations table
The first housemate listed is nominated for two points, while the second housemate is nominated for one point. The two or more housemates with the most nomination points face the public vote to save/evict, and when the save votes are subtracted from the evict votes, the housemate with the most evict votes is evicted.

Notes
 This week the nominations were fake.
 Marko was fake evicted, and he has to live in the upstairs room undetected by the others. If he passes this mission, he will be immune from the next nominations.
 Marko was supposed to live in the upstairs room undetected by the others, but he voluntarily threw in the towel after less than 24 hours and rejoined the others, so he was automatically up for eviction.
 There was a double eviction this Sunday.
 Andreas, Mia and Niko were nominated for discussing nominations, talking about previous Big Brother seasons and talking about casting/production issues. Harri was automatically nominated for not going to bed when told to do so.
 Harri was initially up for eviction but he was taken ill with blood poisoning during the week and left the house to go to the hospital. 
  This week the housemates nominated who they wanted to stay in the house. The two or more housemates with the fewest points were up for eviction. 
 Andreas, Johan, Marianne, Niko and Tero were banned from nominating as punishment for discussing nominations. 
 Johan won immunity during this week's task. 
  Since Johan was in the Big Brother Africa house, Munya swapped with Johan from the Big Brother Africa house nominated in his place. 
 Johan was automatically nominated by Big Brother because he voluntarily left Big Brother house in Africa. He also was not allowed to nominate because he was immune from being nominated last week because he was in Africa.
 This week the nominations were fake, all housemates were up for eviction.
 There was a triple eviction this Sunday.
 There were no nominations in the final week and the public were voting for housemates to win, rather than be evicted.

References

External links
Official Website 

2008 Finnish television seasons
04